The 1996 European Cup was the 32nd and last edition of the European Cup, IIHF's premier European club ice hockey tournament. The season started on October 11, 1996, and finished on December 30, 1996.

The tournament was won by Lada Togliatti, who beat Modo in the final.

First group round

Group A
(Belgrade, Serbia, FR Yugoslavia)

Group A standings

Group B
(Ljubljana, Slovenia)

Group B standings

Group C
(Sheffield, England, United Kingdom)

Group C standings

Group D
(Novopolotsk, Belarus)

Group D standings

Group E
(Nowy Targ, Poland)

Group E standings

 VEU Feldkirch,
 HC Nik's Brih,
 Storhamar,
 HC Bolzano,
 Brest HC,
 HPK,
 TJ VSŽ Košice,
 HC Petra Vsetín,
 Lada Togliatti,
 Modo   :  bye

Second group round

Group F
(Togliatti, Russia)

Group F standings

Group G
(Bolzano, Italy)

Group G standings

Group H
(Hämeenlinna, Finland)

Group H standings

Group J
(Feldkirch, Vorarlberg, Austria)

Group J standings

Group K
(Bordeaux, France)

Group K standings

 Düsseldorfer EG    :  bye

Final stage
(Düsseldorf, North Rhine-Westphalia, Germany)

Third round

Group L

Group L standings

Group M

Group M standings

Third place match

Final

References
 

1
IIHF European Cup